Myeik Yazawin is an 18th-century Burmese chronicle that covers the history of Myeik region. It was written three decades after the Burmese annexation of the region from Siam. It has been translated into English by J.S. Furnivall.

References

Bibliography
 

1795 non-fiction books
18th-century history books
Burmese chronicles
Tanintharyi Region